"International Bright Young Thing" is a song by the British alternative dance band Jesus Jones. It was released as the third single from their second album Doubt, and was a top-ten hit in Britain. It followed "Real Real Real" and "Right Here, Right Now". All three singles were included on a Jesus Jones compilation album Never Enough: The Best of Jesus Jones released in 2002.
The single reached No. 7 on the UK Singles Chart in January 1991.

Credits 
 Produced by Jesus Jones
 Engineer Darren Allison
 Recorded at Ezee Studios and Matrix Studios in London.

References

External links
 "International Bright Young Thing" at allmusic.com
 "International Bright Young Thing" at discogs.com

Jesus Jones songs
1991 singles
1991 songs
Food Records singles